Moslem Darabi  (Persian:  مسلم دارابی) (born 1981) is an Iranian strongman. He is the two time reigning Iran's Strongest Man. He was born in Sahneh, an Kurdish city in the Kermanshah province).

Strongman career
Darabi participated several times in Iran's Strongest Man competition, and reached the finals three times from 2009 to 2011. He finished runner-up in 2009 & and 2010 became the champion in 2011, and successfully defended his title in 2012.

References

External links
مردان آهنین سال1390
 https://web.archive.org/web/20110829024313/http://moslemdarabi.com/home.html

See also
Iran's Strongest Man
World Strongman Cup Federation

1981 births
Living people
Iranian powerlifters
Iranian strength athletes
Kurdish sportspeople
People from Sahneh